The Department of East Tennessee and West Virginia was a Confederate Army command in the Trans-Allegheny Theater during the American Civil War.  This department existed in two previous forms during the war.

Department of Southwestern Virginia
Organized May 8, 1861 for the mountainous region of southwest Virginia and present-day southern West Virginia.

Commanders:
 William W. Loring - May 8, 1861 - October 16, 1862
 John Echols - October 16, 1862 - November 19, 1862
 John Stuart Williams - November 19, 1862 - November 21, 1862

Trans-Allegheny Department
Renamed on November 25, 1862 and extended to the border of eastern Kentucky.  On September 25, extended to include the areas of southwestern Virginia formerly encompassed by the Department of East Tennessee and forces east of Knoxville.  On March 19, 1864, the area around Saltville, Virginia was added to the department and, briefly from April 23 to May 2, the entirety of the Department of East Tennessee was added to the department.

Commanders:
 John Stuart Williams (temp.) - November 21, 1862 - December 10, 1862
 Samuel Jones - December 10, 1862 - February 25, 1864
 John C. Breckinridge - February 25, 1864 - May 23, 1864
 William "Grumble" Jones - May 23, 1864 - May 31, 1864
 George B. Crittenden (temp.) - May 31, 1864 - June 22, 1864
 John H. Morgan (temp.) - June 22, 1864 - August 22, 1864
 John Echols (temp.) - August 22, 1864 - September 17, 1864
 John C. Breckinridge - September 17, 1864 - September 27, 1864

Department of East Tennessee and Southwestern Virginia
Organized September 27, 1864.  The Valley District was added on April 9, 1865 from the Department of Northern Virginia.

Commanders:
 John C. Breckinridge - September 27, 1864 - February 20, 1865
 Jubal A. Early - February 20, 1865 - March 29, 1865
 John Echols - March 29, 1865 - April 19, 1865

Department of Tennessee and Georgia
Merged with the Department of Tennessee and Georgia on April 19, 1865.

Sources
Eicher, John H., & Eicher, David J., Civil War High Commands, Stanford University Press, 2001, .

East Tennessee and West Virginia